Canada Alamosa an Americanized version of the Spanish Cañada Alamosa (pronounced Cănyădă Ălămosă, translated as Glen or Valley of the Cottonwoods), is a term historically applied to five geographical features, all in the same immediate area in southwest Socorro and northwest Sierra Counties, New Mexico.  In historical texts the name, Canada Alamosa is applied inter-changeably to the five features, and it is often only the context that distinguishes one feature from the other.

Canada Alamosa can refer to: 
 
1) Cañada Alamosa, the entire valley, glen or ravine composing the watershed of Alamosa Creek, which includes the box canyon midway along its length. It was later all renamed Monticello Canyon.  Alamosa Creek was also originally known as Arroyo Alamosa, or Rio Alamosa or later Alamosa River; 

2) The box canyon, part of Cañada Alamosa, midway along the course of Alamosa Creek, which box canyon is also known today as Monticello Canyon, or Monticello Box Canyon, or simply Monticello Box; 

3) The area of Cañada Alamosa above Monticello Box, the box canyon which the Warm Springs band of Apaches regard as their home-base, and which contains the site of a warm springs Ojo Caliente, whose waters flow down the creek of Spring Canyon southward into Alamosa Creek just above the upper end of the box canyon;

4) Canada Alamosa, the Americanized name that Union Army reports called the town of San Ygnacio de Alamosa or Alamosa; site of the Battle of Canada Alamosa that was located in the Cañada Alamosa nearby its confluence with the Rio Grande;

5) Canada Alamosa, the Americanized historic name of Cañada Alamosa a small largely Hispanic community which was settled from San Ygnacio de Alamosa in about 1863-65 a few miles south of the box canyon on Alamosa Creek, but which changed its name in 1881 to the present name of Monticello, New Mexico.

Cañada Alamosa is the historic name of an area which Apache bands regarded as their ancestral home base in the mid 1800s.  Prominent among these bands were the Warm Springs band (Chihenne, or Red Paint People).  The area centered on the Canada Alamosa, a high walled box canyon of about 12 miles length, midway along the course of Alamosa Creek.  Because of the canyon the stream was also referred to as the Canada Alamosa.  The Warm Springs band considered the heart of their homeland to be a warm springs, Ojo Caliente, located just at the western entrance to the canyon. The federal government intermittently maintained a series of Apache Indian Agencies based on Ojo Caliente and the Canada Alamosa area from 1852 to 1877.

Between 1863 and 1866, a community of native New Mexican settlers from San Ygnacio de la Alamosa and a few ex-soldiers from the Union Army was established on Alamosa Creek, that became known as Cañada Alamosa.  It was located about 16 miles south of Ojo Caliente, and about 4 miles south of the downstream end of the canyon.  After the town was established leaders of the Chihenne, or Warm Springs band of Apaches made a treaty with the inhabitants of the town, which was allegedly never broken because it provided economic benefit to both the inhabitants of the town and the Chihenne Apaches.  Under this treaty a dubious and shadowy trade was carried on, in which the Apaches brought stolen livestock (horses, mules and cattle) along with plundered goods, back to Cañada Alamosa, although Apache historians would dispute this.  These were the spoils taken during wars with settlers and travelers in New Mexico, Arizona and Old Mexico, which were traded for whisky, ammunition and sundry necessities.  In 1874 an agency was constructed at Ojo Caliente for the Warm Springs Apaches.  In a sudden reversal of policy, this agency was then abolished after 1877 and the Warm Springs band was moved to the San Carlos Reservation.  Some of the Warm Springs band refused to accept this transfer, and under war leaders Victorio and Nana entered into a period of continued guerrilla warfare with U.S. and Mexican forces, the Victorio's War. At the end of which they either became casualties in scattered conflicts, or were forced to surrender and went into captivity or onto reservations far from the Canada Alamosa area.

In 1881, after its days as an illicit trading center were past, the town of Canada Alamosa changed its name to Monticello, and since then the canyon of the Alamosa has occasionally been referred to as Monticello Canyon, or Monticello Box Canyon. Today the Canada Alamosa area remains an isolated and sparsely populated area in southwest Socorro County and northwest Sierra County, New Mexico.  Monticello, although still inhabited, is reduced in population and is listed as a ghost town. The adobe ruins of the old Ojo Caliente agency, about a half mile  to the east of the upstream opening of the canyon, have melted into the ground. The Ojo Caliente hot springs, at the upstream entrance to the Canada Alamosa on Alamosa Creek in southwest Socorro County, New Mexico (33.570084°-107.595117°) generates a major part of the flow of the Canada Alamosa, which runs through the canyon and is then gathered into a ditch system, and is expended on small local fields along Alamosa Creek, above and below Monticello.

Note 1  The Ojo Caliente hot springs, an uninhabited area at the upstream entrance to the Canada Alamosa on Alamosa Creek in southwest Socorro County, New Mexico (33.570084°-107.595117°) should not be confused with Ojo Caliente, New Mexico, a small unincorporated community in Taos County, New Mexico (36.304545° -106.051235°) on the Ojo Caliente Rio, about 200 miles away to the north and east.
Note 2  The Alamosa Creek referred to in this article, which extends from the southwest quadrant of Socorro County to the northwest quadrant of Sierra County should not be confused with the Alamosa Creek, which is in northern Socorro County.

Cañada Alamosa, the creek and the canyon midway along its course
Cañada Alamosa is the historical name of the topographical feature of a canyon on Alamosa Creek (more recently referred to as Monticello Canyon, or Monticello Box Canyon). Although Alamosa Creek flows generally north to southeast, the canyon portion is located about midway along its length, and is oriented in a northwest-southeast direction and separates the San Mateo Mountains on the north and northeast of the canyon from the smaller Sierra Cuchillo on the south.

The term Cañada Alamosa is also generally applied to Alamosa Creek as well. Alamosa Creek enters the western entrance to the canyon in a desert area about 30 miles downstream from its source in the San Mateo Mountains, and about 37 miles upstream from the mouth of the creek where it empties into the Rio Grande near the upper end of Elephant Butte Reservoir.  The canyon extends for about 12 miles downstream. The canyon separates the Alamosa Creek into a northern upstream segment and a southern downstream segment.

Alamosa Creek above the Monticello Box canyon is a seasonal drainage, with a dry creek bed for much of the year.  As the bed of Alamosa Creek approaches the canyon, it receives a flow of water from a series of springs.  About 550 meters upstream (west) and then another 150 up-slope (north) from the creek bed is Willow Springs.  Opposite Willow Springs and along the south bank of the creek are a series of small springs.  About 300 meters north and upslope from the mouth of the Canada Alamosa is Ojo Caliente, a warm spring that releases a flow of warm water down a small coulee to the Alamosa creek bed.

Apache Warm Spring is located about 1000 meters south of the entrance to the box canyon.  This spring no longer produces a surface flow.  It is located in Red Paint Canyon where there are exposures of red earth which the Warms Springs Apaches used as a face paint, and which gave them the name of Chihenne, or the Red Paint People.  Apache Warm Spring is the site of a beryllium deposit, and a controversy occurred from 2009 to 2012 when BE Resources, Inc. sought and received a permit to conduct core drilling at the site.  The concern was from Apache groups over the anticipated damage to the Ojo Caliente spring, a sacred site, and from local residents concerned about the potential disruption of the flow of other springs in the area that provided irrigation water along Alamosa Creek. However, after drilling in 2011 the corrected data indicated that the deposits of beryllium and other rare earth minerals were not present in payable quantities, and BE Resources, Inc. decided to cease exploration work at the site, and focus elsewhere on other mining options, leaving the Red Paint Canyon area relatively unchanged.

These springs that flow near the entrance to the canyon generate a year-round flow of water.  The total volume of the total discharge is about 2000 gallons of water a minute at a temperature of about 85 degrees Fahrenheit.  The discharge of water continues down the canyon, replenished by other streamside springs. After about 12 miles the entire creek flow is collected into a ditch that is used to irrigate small farming plots along the creek for about 6 miles to present-day Monticello.  As the water is used for irrigation, its flow diminishes, and shortly after Monticello, the flow becomes nonexistent.  From this point Alamosa Creek returns to a dry seasonal creek bed as it extends to the junction of Alamosa Creek and the Rio Grande, at the upper end of Elephant Butte Reservoir.

A New Mexico state road goes up to Monticello, and county roads continue up to the canyon. A Forest Road extends from there through the canyon.  In the canyon proper this road often runs right up the flowing river bed. When access was permitted, this road could be traversed by vehicles, though it is recommended by signage along the road that the vehicles be high-clearance and have four-wheel drive.  At the upper end of the canyon the Forest Road intersects with state road NM 52.

Cañada Alamosa (present-day Monticello NM), the historic Hispanic community downstream from the canyon
Cañada Alamosa is the name of a historic Hispanic  community located on the Alamosa Creek about 20 miles upstream from where it  empties into the Rio Grande.  This community was settled in 1856 in the heart of Chihenne Territory, about 17 miles south of Ojo Caliente, the hot springs that the Chihenne considered the center of their homeland.

In 1867 the Apache Chief Loco made a limited peace with the community of Cañada Alamosa.  This peace agreement was unique among the annals of Apache tribes.  It purportedly was the only treaty never broken by either side.

This treaty was sustained not because the two sides mutually liked or trusted each other, but because of economics.  The Indians lived by hunting and by raiding over a vast area and needed a safe place to sell their stolen goods and livestock, while the people of the town made a healthy profit on the deals.

The community provided whiskey and particularly arms and ammunition in trade for the spoils of raiding.  Ammunition that fitted the guns of the Indians was particularly necessary to allow the Apaches to continue to hunt, and also to raid, which involved plundering and killing other Anglo and Hispanic settlers.

The homeland of the Warm Springs (Chihenne) band of Apaches was centered on Ojo Caliente, a hot spring on the east side of the canyon of Alamosa Creek, about 18 miles away. In 1874 the U.S. built an agency at the site for them.  The presence of the canyon on Alamosa Creek buffered the Hispanic community from the comings and goings of the Apache band. In 1877 the U.S. reversed its policy and abolished this agency, forcing the Warm Springs (Chihenne) Band to go to a centralized Apache agency at San Carlos. This precipitated a guerrilla war in which the Warm Springs Apaches were either killed or forced to surrender and accept imprisonment or removal to distant agencies where they were overseen by the U.S. Army.

The community of Cañada Alamosa continued, being now in unmolested control of the water flow of Alamosa Creek and the irrigable land along the creek.  In 1881 the first postmaster, Aristide Bourguet, renamed the town for Monticello, New York. The community continues today, though with a much reduced population. Today Monticello and nearby Las Placitas are home to several organic farms that use the irrigation system fed from the springs of Alamosa Creek.  These farms produce fruits and vegetables.  Local people also produce herbal health and beauty products and balsamic vinegar.

Cañada Alamosa, the area claimed as a homeland by the Warm Springs (Chihenne) band of the Chiricahua Apaches
Cañada Alamosa is the term used by historians to refer to the ancestral homeland of the Warm Springs Band (Chihenne, or Red Paint People) of the Chiricahua Apache.  Their homeland centered on the Cañada Alamosa area, and they considered a spring, Ojo Caliente, the heart of this ancestral base. This hot springs is located just at the upstream entrance to the box canyon on Alamosa Creek.

The commitment of some Apache bands to a homeland base centered on Ojo Caliente at the entrance to the Cañada Alamosa resulted in consideration by the federal government of an agency for Apache bands that included this geographic area.  In 1852, the federal government established a "Southern Apache Agency", that included this area. This Agency originally had sweeping jurisdiction over several Apache bands that roamed over a much wider area than Cañada Alamosa, including the Mimbreño, Mogollon, Coyotero, and, for a time, Mescalero Apache.

Over the years the agency was located at various places in the vicinity of Ojo Caliente (Hot Springs) at the Cañada Alamosa in New Mexico. In 1873 the agency and the reservation was moved to a completely different location in New Mexico, in the Tularosa Valley. However, in 1874 the reservation and agency were moved back to Ojo Caliente, just north of the canyon.  During this period a set of adobe buildings for the agency were built about half a mile east of the upstream mouth of the canyon.  Both the reservation and agency were abolished in 1877, when the Indians at the agency were moved to the San Carlos reservation in Arizona, but a man was left in charge of the property at the agency until the following year.

During the most active time that the agency was centered on Ojo Caliente, the Chihenne band produced some outstanding warrior–leaders.  Besides Loco, during the time while the community of Cañada Alamosa was flourishing as a trade center for the spoils from Apache raiding parties, the Chihenne were also led by Victorio a famous war chief, and noted for  Lozen, Victorio's sister and a skilled warrior and prophetess, and Nana, a noted warrior/chief who raided and fought fiercely through his 80s.

After 1877, upon the final rejection of their request for a reservation near Cañada Alamosa, their homeland, Victorio, Lozen and Nana with other Warm Springs/Chihenne Apaches fled the San Carlos reservation and conducted a sustained war through 1886.  It is known as Victorio's War and was waged in areas away from Cañada Alamosa.  It resulted in the death of many Americans and Mexicans and also in the death or capture of most of the surviving Warm Springs/Chihenne Apaches.  The captured group, as well as the few remnants of the Warm Springs/Chihenne Band, were considered by the U.S. authorities as part of the Chiricahua band of Apaches, so that they were part of the deportation of Chiricahua to Florida, then Alabama, and eventually a reservation in Oklahoma.

Visiting the Canada Alamosa Area, and Ojo Caliente Hot Springs Today

New Mexico State Highway 52, going to the north and west end of the box canyon, at the site of Ojo Caliente Hot Springs

 Approach from the Rio Grand Valley, near Elephant Butte Lakes.  Starting from the Rio Grande Valley, in the vicinity of Elephant Butte Lake (exiting from I-25 at the "Truth or Consequences Municipal Airport") New Mexico State Highway 52 goes generally west through Cuchillo, New Mexico, and continues in a northerly and westerly direction to the area of Winston and Chloride, New Mexico, after which it turns north and passes to the west of the mountain range known as the Sierra Cuchillo. and then turns back east to return to Alamosa Creek, intersecting it near the west (or upstream) entrance to the box canyon feature known as the Canada Alamosa, where it meets Forest Road 140, (see paragraph below).  Near this juncture is the Ojo Caliente hot springs revered as the center of a home base by the Warm Springs Apache band, and the site of the historical Ojo Caliente Agency, also known as the "Hot Springs Indian Reservation".  From this point, at the western (or upstream) entrance to the box canyon, the traveler can go back east and south through the box canyon on Forest Road 140 to Monticello and back to the Rio Grande Valley via State Highway 142, or continue north on State Highway 52, passing through Dusty, New Mexico, to a junction with U.S. Highway 60, west of Magdalena, N.M, and near the "very large array".
 Approach from U.S. Highway 60 near the "Very Large Array".  Starting From the east-west trending U.S. Highway 60 near the "Very Large Array" in the vicinity of Magdalena, New Mexico, the New Mexico State Highway 52 runs south to the canyon feature known as the Canada Alamosa, and the Ojo Caliente hot springs, reversing the route of the previous paragraph.

New Mexico State Highway 142, and Forest Road 140 going to Monticello. New Mexico (the historic Canada Alamosa community) and continuing up through the box canyon to the site of Ojo Caliente Hot Springs

New Mexico State Highway 142 branches off State Highway 52, about 5 miles west of the point where Highway 52 exits I 25 in the Rio Grande Valley, in the vicinity of Elephant Butte Lake.  State Highway 142 then goes west and north out of the Rio Grande Valley, up to Monticello, New Mexico.  After reaching Monticello, the road extends up Alamosa Creek, becoming Forest Road 140 which goes north and west through the box canyon, often running right in the river bed.  Forest Road 140 emerges from the north-western end of the canyon, passes the coulee down which Ojo Caliente flows and meets New Mexico State Highway 52 (see route noted above).

Forest Road 140 may be only seasonally passable through the box canyon, and caution should be exercised on this portion of the route, that travels through the box canyon north of Monticello.

Notes
The Apache name for the Warm Spring band, indicating the Red Paint People, has been spelled in different ways.  The Canada Alamosa Project refers to the "Chihende" band of Apaches.  The Article by Virginia T. McLemore on the Geology of the area that includes Red Paint Canyon, refers to the Tcihene Apache.  However the more common spelling is Chihenne (or sometimes Chihene), and that is used in this article

External links
   This internet citation has the Congressional edition, Volume 2467, page 567 with the actual language of the three critical executive orders for the Canada Alamosa area first establishing the "Hot Springs Indian Reservation" centered on the Ojo Caliente Hot Springs at the upper end of the Canada Alamosa canyon in 1875, and then canceling that order and restoring the reservation lands to the public domain in 1877.  
1) The 4/9/74 Presidential Executive Order of President U.S. Grant that withdrew from sale as public domain federal lands a designated tract in "the valley of the Canada Alamosa" near "the present town of Canada Alamosa" for the "such Indians as the Secretary of the Interior may see fit to locate thereon"; 
2) The 12/21/75 Presidential Executive Order of President U.S. Grant setting apart an even larger parcel of lands "for the use and occupancy of the Southern Apache and such other Indians to be known as the 'Hot Springs Indian Reservation:'". 
3) The 8/25/77 Presidential Executive Order of President R.B. Hayes vacating the previous executive order of 12/21/75, thereby terminating the "Hot Springs Indian Reservation" and returning the land to the public domain.
  Google Books partial text of "Chief Loco: Apache Peacemaker", by Shapard,Bud (2010), University of Oklahoma Press. Norman, Oklahoma.
  The website of "The Cañada Alamosa Project" a joint project to "study, understand and relate the stories of the generations of people who lived along Alamosa Creek,...during the past 2000 years."
   McLemore, Virginia T. "Geology, Mineral Resources, And Geoarchaeology Of The Montoya Butte Quadrangle, Including The Ojo Caliente No. 2 Mining District, Socorro County, New Mexico". New Mexico Bureau of Geology and Mineral Resources, A Division of the New Mexico Institute of Mining and Technology. December 2010
   McLemore, Virginia T., "Geology and Mineral Resources in the Ojo Caliente No. 2 Mining District, Socorro County, New Mexico" New Mexico Geological Society Guidebook, 63 547 rd Field Conference, Warm Springs Region, 2012, p. 547-558

References
 Shapard, Bud (2010) Chief Loco: Apache Peacemaker, University of Oklahoma Press. Norman, Oklahoma, 1st Edition, .
 Debo, Angie. Geronimo: The Man, His Time, His Place. Norman, Oklahoma: University of Oklahoma Press. . 
 Roberts, David (1993, 1994). Once They Moved Like the Wind. New York, New York 10020: Simon and Schuster. pp.  90, 91. .

Geography of New Mexico